Carl Myerscough (pronounced Myers/co) (born 21 October 1979) is a retired English track and field athlete. He specialized in the shot put and discus throw and exceeded the British record in the shot put with a best of 21.92m set in winning the NCAA championships in Sacramento, California in 2003, although the performance was not ratified by UK Athletics.

Biography
Carl won the UK championships in the Shot put 10 times consecutively from 2003–12, (The most in any athletics discipline by a male UK athlete). While competing for the University of Nebraska he gained 2 indoor (2002–03) and 2 outdoor (2003-04) NCAA division 1 championships. He graduated from the University of Nebraska in 2004, with a degree in Fine Art.
He won the European Cup in 2004 (Bydgoszcz, Poland) with a throw of 20.85m.

In 2002 (Manchester) he won Bronze in the Commonwealth Games Shot put and in 2010 (Dehli) bronze in the discus throw.

He was a 2012 Olympian.

Nicknamed the Blackpool Tower due to his stats at 6 ft 10" and 25 stone (350 lb).

Doping
In 1999, Myerscough's record was tarnished when he tested positive for the second time, for "a cocktail of banned substances" and was subsequently banned from competing for two years, and banned for life from the Olympics. The Olympic ban was subsequently overturned by the Court of Arbitration for Sport and he represented Team GB at the 2012 Olympics in London. Myerscough placed 29th in the qualifying rounds and did not progress further.

He has always denied knowingly taking drugs and believed he was a victim of sabotage.   Myerscough is married to the American athlete Melissa Price, who was also banned at one time as a result of drug use in connection with the BALCO scandal.

See also
 List of doping cases in athletics

References

1979 births
Living people
People from Hambleton, Lancashire
English male discus throwers
British male discus throwers
English male shot putters
British male shot putters
Olympic male shot putters
Olympic athletes of Great Britain
Athletes (track and field) at the 2012 Summer Olympics
Commonwealth Games bronze medallists for England
Commonwealth Games medallists in athletics
Athletes (track and field) at the 2002 Commonwealth Games
Athletes (track and field) at the 2006 Commonwealth Games
Athletes (track and field) at the 2010 Commonwealth Games
Athletes (track and field) at the 2014 Commonwealth Games
British Athletics Championships winners
AAA Championships winners
Nebraska Cornhuskers men's track and field athletes
Doping cases in athletics
English sportspeople in doping cases
Medallists at the 2002 Commonwealth Games
Medallists at the 2010 Commonwealth Games